Wet 'n Wild is a name used by various water parks across the United States, Brazil and Mexico, originally owned by SeaWorld creator George Millay. It is not to be confused with the Wet'n'Wild brand owned by Village Roadshow Theme Parks and CNL Lifestyle Properties or the stand-alone waterpark Wet N' Wild Waterworld in Anthony, Texas.

History
The name was first used for a water park when SeaWorld founder George Millay opened his first water park Wet 'n Wild Orlando in Orlando, Florida in 1977. Wet 'n Wild in Orlando, however, closed permanently December 31, 2016, and was replaced by Volcano Bay. Millay went on to open six more water parks under the same name in the United States, Brazil and Mexico. In 1997 and 1998, Millay sold the water parks to various owners including Universal Destinations & Experiences, Palace Entertainment and private companies for a total of $77 million.

Locations

 Wet 'n Wild Emerald Pointe – operated by Palace Entertainment in Greensboro, North Carolina
 Wet 'n Wild Cancun – a water park in Mexico. At opening in June 1997, the park spanned 
 Wet 'n Wild São Paulo – a water park in Brazil. The $42 million park opened in October 1998, and spanned

Previous locations
 Wet 'n Wild Orlando – operated by Universal Destinations & Experiences in Orlando, Florida, closed December 31, 2016. It has been replaced by the new Volcano Bay waterpark that opened in 2017.
 Arlington, Texas – rebranded as Six Flags Hurricane Harbor Arlington when purchased by Six Flags in 1997. Located across Interstate 30 from Six Flags Over Texas.
 Garland, Texas – formerly a Herschend Family Entertainment "White Water" park. The site is now occupied by a CarMax dealership. 
 Wet 'n Wild Las Vegas, operated from 1985 to 2004 – now All Net Resort & Arena; not to be confused with the present-day Wet'n'Wild Las Vegas.
 Salvador, Bahia – opened in 1996 as the first international park. It cost $28 million and spanned , however the park has gone bankrupt.

Cancelled locations
 Rio de Janeiro – originally targeted for an October 1999 opening
 Brasilia – $32 million,  originally targeted to open in late 1998

See also
 List of water parks

References

External links
 Wet 'n Wild Cancun
 Wet 'n Wild Emerald Pointe
 Wet 'n Wild São Paulo

Palace Entertainment
Universal Parks & Resorts
American brands
Brazilian brands